Hans Grüneberg  (26 May 1907 – 23 October 1982), whose name was also written as Hans Grueneberg and Hans Gruneberg, was a British geneticist. Grüneberg was born in Wuppertal–Elberfeld in Germany. He obtained an MD from the University of Bonn, a PhD in biology from the University of Berlin and a DSc from the University of London. He arrived in London in 1933, at the invitation of J.B.S. Haldane and Sir Henry Dale.

He was elected a Fellow of the Royal Society in 1956. Most of his work focused on mouse genetics, in which his speciality was the study of pleiotropic effects of mutations on the development of the mouse skeleton.

He was the first person to describe siderocytes and sideroblasts, atypical nucleated erythrocytes with granules of iron accumulated in perinuclear mitochondria. This he reported in the journal Nature. The Grüneberg ganglion, an olfactory ganglion in rodents, was first described by Hans Grueneberg in 1973.

Career 
 Honorary Research Assistant, University College London, 1933–38
 Moseley Research Student of Royal Society, 1938–42
 Captain, Royal Army Medical Corps, 1942–46
 Reader in Genetics, University College London, 1946–55
 Honorary Director of the Medical Research Council Experimental Genetics Unit at University College London, 1955–1972
 Professor of Genetics University College London, 1956–1974
 Affiliated with the Department of Pathology, Mount Vernon Hospital, Northwood, Middlesex
 Emeritus Professor University College London, from retirement, 1974

Books 
1947. Animal genetics and medicine. Hamish Hamilton, London.
1952. The genetics of the mouse. 2nd ed, revised and enlarged. Nijhoff, The Hague.
1963. The pathology of development: a study of inherited skeletal disorders in animals. Wiley, London.

References

External links 
 Codebreakers: Makers of Modern Genetics: the Hans Grüneberg papers

Sources 

 Professor Hans Grüneberg's personal papers archive is available for study at the Wellcome Collection (some material is digitised and digitally accessible via the website).

1907 births
1982 deaths
Scientists from Wuppertal
German emigrants to England
British geneticists
20th-century British biologists
Royal Army Medical Corps officers
British Army personnel of World War II
Fellows of the Royal Society
Jewish scientists
Academics of University College London
20th-century British medical doctors
Jewish emigrants from Nazi Germany to the United Kingdom